Langley Green is the name of several locations in England:
 Langley Green, West Midlands
 Langley Green railway station
 Langley Green, West Sussex

See also
 Langley (disambiguation)